The men's 200 metres event at the 2015 Military World Games was held on 7 and 8 October at the KAFAC Sports Complex.

Records
Prior to this competition, the existing world and CISM record were as follows:

Schedule

Medalists

Results

Round 1
Qualification: First 3 in each heat (Q) and next 6 fastest (q) qualified for the semifinals.

Wind:Heat 1: -0.6 m/s, Heat 2: +0.4 m/s, Heat 3: +0.7 m/s, Heat 4: -0.2 m/s, Heat 5: -1.3 m/s, Heat 6: -0.7 m/s

Semifinals
Qualification: First 2 in each heat (Q) and next 2 fastest (q) qualified for the final.

Wind:Heat 1: -0.7 m/s, Heat 2: +0.1 m/s, Heat 3: -0.4 m/s

Final
Wind: +1.7 m/s

References

200